Mark Mitchell Campbell (December 31, 1897 – June 21, 1963) was a barnstormer, movie stunt man, Lockheed executive from 1934 to 1960. He was the co-founder of the Silver Wings Fraternity in California.

Biography
He was born on December 31, 1897. 

For Evelyn Trout, a prototype of the Bone Gold Eagle, serial number C-801, was designed by R.O. Bone and Campbell.

He died on June 21, 1963. Campbell was buried in the Portal of Folded Wings Shrine to Aviation.

External links

References

American aviators
1897 births
1963 deaths
Campbell